Mark Andrew Ritchie is a Chicago Board of Trade and Chicago Mercantile Exchange commodities trader. A twenty-year veteran of the financial industry, Mark is one of the original founding partners of Chicago Research and Trading (CRT) (the other his brother Joe Ritchie) once the largest options firm in the industry. He is also the author of two books, God in the Pits and Spirit of the Rainforest. 

Mark has traveled extensively throughout the third world as an amateur anthropologist with a special interest in the poor.  Featured by BusinessWeek in a November 3, 1986 article titled These Traders Made All-Star By Hitting Singles.

Mark grew up in the poverty of Afghanistan, the deep south of Texas, and an Oregon-coast logging town.

Education 
 B.A. Trinity International University, 1973
 M-Div Trinity International University, 1980

Career 

Mark was at one point a theology student and also worked as a night-shift prison guard before he became one of the founding members of C.R.T.

Personal 

Mark Ritchie has 5 kids and 11 grandchildren.

Philanthropy 
Mark is a member of Board of Directors of Warm Blankets Orphan Care International and Southern Evangelical Seminary and Bible College.

Published works 
 
 
 Ritchie, Mark Andrew (2014). My trading Bible: Lose your shirt. Save your life. Keep trading. Island Lake Press. .

See also 
Joe Ritchie

References

Further reading 
 
 

Ritchie, Mark Andrew (2014). My trading Bible: Lose your shirt. Save your life. Keep trading. Island Lake Press. . 

1956 births
Amateur anthropologists
American commodities traders
American derivatives traders
American financial analysts
American investors
American money managers
American hedge fund managers
American stock traders
Living people
Stock and commodity market managers
Trinity International University alumni